
Anle may refer to:

Anle District, a district of Keelung, Taiwan
Anle (618–619), era name used by Li Gui, self-proclaimed emperor of Liang during the Sui–Tang transition
Princess Anle (684–710), Emperor Zhongzong of Tang's daughter

Places in People's Republic of China

Towns
Anle, Fujian, in Ninghua County, Fujian
Anle Town, Luoyang, in Luoyang, Henan
Anle, Shandong, in Yanggu County, Shandong

Townships
Anle Yi and Gelao Ethnic Township, in Dafang County, Guizhou
Anle Township, Hanyuan County, in Hanyuan County, Sichuan
Anle Township, Chengdu, in Jianyang, Sichuan
Anle Township, Jiuzhaigou County, in Jiuzhaigou County, Sichuan
Anle Township, Yunnan, in Mouding County, Yunnan

Subdistricts
Anle Subdistrict, Harbin, in Xiangfang District, Harbin, Heilongjiang
Anle Subdistrict, Luoyang, in Lulong District, Luoyang, Henan

See also
North American Academy of the Spanish Language, also known as Academia Norteamericana de la Lengua Española (ANLE)